Belionota aenea is a Jewel Beetle of the Buprestidae family.

Description

Distribution
This species occurs in Indonesia and New Guinea.

References

 UNiversal Biological Indexer
 Zipcodezoo
 Anic.ento
 Encyclopedia of Life

Beetles of Asia
Buprestidae
Beetles described in 1864